is a 1984 Japanese Pink film written and directed by Masayuki Suo and released by Shintōhō Eiga.

Synopsis
Complications are brought to a middle-class family when older brother Kōichi brings home his new sexually voracious bride Yuriko. Younger brother Kazuo looks to the new arrival as a source of sexual release while sister Akiko surreptitiously works in a soapland and Father lusts after a bar proprietess.

Cast
 Kaoru Kaze as Yuriko Mamiya
 Miki Yamaji as Akiko Mamiya
 Usagi Asō as the Bar Madam
 Ren Osugi as Shukichi Mamiya (the Father)
 Kei Shutō as Kazuo Mamiya
 Shirō Shimomoto as Kōichi Mamiya

Background
Although he had written screenplays for other pink films and was an assistant director (and a bit player) in Kiyoshi Kurosawa's Kandagawa Pervert Wars, this film marks the directorial debut of Masayuki Suo who would later achieve international fame for his film Shall We Dance? Abnormal Family: Older Brother's Bride has been discussed by movie critics as an homage to or parody of the family dramas of early Japanese director Yasujirō Ozu. Jasper Sharp says it wittily puts together the plots of a number of Ozu's best known works within the framework of a pink film. Suo also uses the trademark camera angles, visual effects and stylized movements from Ozu's films in contrast with the sexual antics of this genre.

Availability
The film was released theatrically in Japan in June 1984 and published as a DVD in Japan on June 28, 2002 by Uplink. It had earlier (May 2000) been released in Video CD format with Chinese and English subtitles by Asia Video Publishing Company.

References

External links
Review at Midnight Eye
 

1984 films
Films directed by Masayuki Suo
Japanese sex comedy films
Pink films
Shintōhō Eiga films
1980s pornographic films
1980s English-language films
1980s Japanese films
1984 directorial debut films